The 2009 Saitama Seibu Lions season features the Lions quest to win back-to-back Japan Series titles.

Regular season

Standings

Game log

|- align="center" bgcolor="bbffbb"
| 1 || April 3 || @Marines || 2 - 5 || Wakui (1-0) || Shimizu (0-1) || Graman (1) || 30,041 || 1-0-0
|- align="center" bgcolor="#ffbbbb"
| 2 || April 4 || @Marines || 10 - 5 || Komiyama (1-0) || Hoashi (0-1) ||  || 26,819 || 1-1-0
|- align="center" bgcolor="#ffbbbb"
| 3 || April 5 || @Marines || 6 - 5 || Sikorski (1-0) || Graman (0-1) ||  || 24,313 || 1-2-0
|- align="center" bgcolor="bbffbb"
| 4 || April 7 || Buffaloes || 8 - 3 || Kishi (1-0) || Kaneko (0-1) ||  || 24,011 || 2-2-0
|- align="center" bgcolor="#ffbbbb"
| 5 || April 8 || Buffaloes || 2 - 10 || Yamamoto (1-0) || Ishii (0-1) ||  || 10,001 || 2-3-0
|- align="center" bgcolor="bbffbb"
| 6 || April 9 || Buffaloes || 13 - 6 || Nishiguchi (1-0) || Hirano (0-1) ||  || 9,813 || 3-3-0
|- align="center" bgcolor="bbffbb"
| 7 || April 10 || @Eagles || 0 - 6 || Wakui (2-0) || Iwakuma (1-1) ||  || 15,990 || 4-3-0
|- align="center" bgcolor="bbffbb"
| 8 || April 11 || @Eagles || 2 - 5 || Onodera (1-0) || Hasebe (0-1) || Graman (2) || 17,835 || 5-3-0
|- align="center" bgcolor="#ffbbbb"
| 9 || April 12 || @Eagles || 4 - 1 || Rasner (1-0) || Wasdin (0-1) ||  || 17,477 || 5-4-0
|- align="center" bgcolor="bbffbb"
| 10 || April 14 || @Hawks || 3 - 5 || Kishi (2-0) || Loe (0-2) || Graman (3) || 14,451 || 6-4-0
|- align="center" bgcolor="#bbbbbb"
| 11 || April 15 || @Hawks || 2 - 2 (12) || colspan=3|Game tied after 12 innings || 26,498 || 6-4-1
|- align="center" bgcolor="bbffbb"
| 12 || April 16 || @Hawks || 5 - 12 || Nishiguchi (2-0) || Otonari (0-2) || Hirano (1) || 25,538 || 7-4-1
|- align="center" bgcolor="#ffbbbb"
| 13 || April 17 || Fighters || 2 - 4 || Darvish (2-1) || Wakui (2-1) || Takeda (2) || 15,181 || 7-5-1
|- align="center" bgcolor="#ffbbbb"
| 14 || April 18 || Fighters || 4 - 6 || Tanimoto (1-0) || Shotsu (0-1) || Takeda (3) || 28,525 || 7-6-1
|- align="center" bgcolor="#ffbbbb"
| 15 || April 19 || Fighters || 6 - 8 || Miyanishi (1-0) || Onodera (1-1) || Takeda (4) || 22,315 || 7-7-1
|-align="center" bgcolor="bbffbb"
| 16 || April 21 || @Buffaloes || 1 - 7 || Kishi (3-0) || Kaneko (1-2) ||  || 10,326 || 8-7-1
|-align="center" bgcolor="#ffbbbb"
| 17 || April 22 || @Buffaloes || 6 - 3 || Yamamoto (2-0) || Ishii (0-2) ||  || 10,805 || 8-8-1
|-align="center" bgcolor="#ffbbbb"
| 18 || April 23 || @Buffaloes || 2 - 1 || Kato (1-0) || Onuma (0-1) ||  || 10,586 || 8-9-1
|-align="center" bgcolor="bbffbb"
| 19 || April 24 || Marines || 3 - 1 || Wakui (3-1) || Karakawa (1-2) ||  || 12,618 || 9-9-1
|-align="center" bgcolor="#ffbbbb"
| 20 || April 25 || Marines || 2 - 3 || Naruse (1-0) || Hoashi (0-2) || Ogino (2) || 23,147 || 9-10-1
|-align="center" bgcolor="#ffbbbb"
| 21 || April 26 || Marines || 5 - 11 || Omine (1-0) || Wasdin (0-2) ||  || 23,647 || 9-11-1
|-align="center" bgcolor="bbffbb"
| 22 || April 28 || Hawks || 5 - 4 || Kishi (4-0) || Loe (0-3) || Onodera (1) || 16,151 || 10-11-1
|-align="center" bgcolor="bbffbb"
| 23 || April 29 || Hawks || 7 - 2 || Ishii (1-2) || Houlton (2-1) ||  || 28,855 || 11-11-1
|-align="center" bgcolor="#ffbbbb"
| 24 || April 30 || Hawks || 5 - 8 || Mizuta (1-0) || Doi (0-1) || Mahara (4) || 15,720 || 11-12-1
|-

|-align="center" bgcolor="bbffbb"
| 25 || May 1 || @Fighters || 1 - 2 (12) || Onuma (1-1) || Tateyama (1-2) || Nogami (1) || 28,007 || 12-12-1
|-align="center" bgcolor="#ffbbbb"
| 26 || May 2 || @Fighters || 7 - 6 (11) || Takeda (1-0) || Nogami (0-1) ||  || 34,711 || 12-13-1
|-align="center" bgcolor="#ffbbbb"
| 27 || May 3 || @Fighters || 6 - 5 (12) || Tanimoto (2-0) || Onodera (1-2) ||  || 40,754 || 12-14-1
|-align="center" bgcolor="bbffbb"
| 28 || May 4 || Eagles || 8 - 3 || Kishi (5-0) || Kawai (0-2) ||  || 33,911 || 13-14-1
|-align="center" bgcolor="#ffbbbb"
| 29 || May 5 || Eagles || 3 - 7 || Isaka (1-0) || Ishii (1-3) ||  || 33,908 || 13-15-1
|-align="center" bgcolor="#ffbbbb"
| 30 || May 6 || Eagles || 3 - 6 || Hasebe (2-2) || Nishiguchi (2-1) ||  || 31,440 || 13-16-1
|-align="center" bgcolor="#ffbbbb"
| 31 || May 8 || @Hawks || 4 - 3 || Settsu (1-2) || Graman (0-2) ||  || 29,611 || 13-17-1
|-align="center" bgcolor="bbffbb"
| 32 || May 9 || @Hawks || 1 - 9 || Hoashi (1-2) || Arakaki (0-2) ||  || 30,863 || 14-17-1
|-align="center" bgcolor="#ffbbbb"
| 33 || May 10 || @Hawks || 8 - 1 || Sugiuchi (4-1) || Nogami (0-2) ||  || 30,337 || 14-18-1
|-align="center" bgcolor="bbffbb"
| 34 || May 12 || @Buffaloes || 5 - 6 || Kishi (6-0) || Kondo (3-2) || Onodera (2) || 10,502 || 15-18-1
|-align="center" bgcolor="bbffbb"
| 35 || May 13 || @Buffaloes || 3 - 8 || Ishii (2-3) || Yamamoto (2-2) ||  || 10,454 || 16-18-1
|-align="center" bgcolor="bbffbb"
| 36 || May 14 || @Buffaloes || 1 - 3 || Nishiguchi (3-1) || Kaneko (3-3) || Onodera (3) || 10,229 || 17-18-1
|-align="center" bgcolor="bbffbb"
| 37 || May 15 || @Marines || 0 - 18 || Wakui (4-1) || Watanabe (1-4) ||  || 17,567 || 18-18-1
|-align="center" bgcolor="#ffbbbb"
| 38 || May 16 || @Marines || 6 - 4 || Ito (2-1) || Onuma (1-2) || Ogino (5) || 20,074 || 18-19-1
|-align="center" bgcolor="#ffbbbb"
| 39 || May 17 || @Marines || 8 - 5 || Ono (2-3) || Hirano (0-1) || Ogino (6) || 14,363 || 18-20-1
|-align="center" bgcolor="#ffbbbb"
| 40 || May 19 || Dragons || 5 - 7 || Asakura (4-2) || Onuma (1-3) || Iwase (9) || 18,110 || 18-21-1
|-align="center" bgcolor="bbffbb"
| 41 || May 20 || Dragons || 2 - 1 (10) || Nogami (1-2) || Asao (3-5) ||  || 19,203 || 19-21-1
|-align="center" bgcolor="#ffbbbb"
| 42 || May 22 || BayStars || 5 - 15 || Miura (5-2) || Wakui (4-2) ||  || 16,323 || 19-22-1
|-align="center" bgcolor="bbffbb"
| 43 || May 23 || BayStars || 10 - 6 || Hoashi (2-2) || Glynn (2-5) ||  || 24,471 || 20-22-1
|-align="center" bgcolor="#ffbbbb"
| 44 || May 24 || @Carp || 7 - 5 || Komatsu (1-0) || Nishiguchi (3-2) || Nagakawa (12) || 28,309 || 20-23-1
|-align="center" bgcolor="#ffbbbb"
| 45 || May 25 || @Carp || 3 - 0 || Otake (4-1) || Kishi (6-1) || Nagakawa (13) || 24,558 || 20-24-1
|-align="center" bgcolor="#ffbbbb"
| 46 || May 27 || @Tigers || 4 - 1 || Shimoyanagi (4-2) || Ishii (2-4) || Fujikawa (4) || 46,160 || 20-25-1
|-align="center" bgcolor="bbffbb"
| 47 || May 28 || @Tigers || 4 - 6 || Wakui (5-2) || Ando (3-4) || Onodera (4) || 44,395 || 21-25-1
|-align="center" bgcolor="bbbbbb"
| 48 || May 30 || Giants || 2 - 2 (12) || colspan=3|Game tied after 12 innings || 33,778  || 21-25-2
|-align="center" bgcolor="bbffbb"
| 49 || May 31 || Giants || 3 - 2 (10) || Onodera (2-2) || Kroon (0-1) ||  || 33,173 || 22-25-2
|-

|-align="center" bgcolor="bbffbb"
| 50 || June 2 || Swallows || 7 - 3 || Wasdin (1-2) || Ishikawa (6-3) ||  || 16,001 || 23-25-2
|-
| 51 || June 3 || Swallows ||  ||  ||  ||  ||  || 
|-
| 52 || June 5 || @BayStars ||  ||  ||  ||  ||  || 
|-
| 53 || June 6 || @BayStars ||  ||  ||  ||  ||  || 
|-
| 54 || June 7 || @Dragons ||  ||  ||  ||  ||  || 
|-
| 55 || June 8 || @Dragons ||  ||  ||  ||  ||  || 
|-
| 56 || June 10 || Tigers ||  ||  ||  ||  ||  || 
|-
| 57 || June 11 || Tigers ||  ||  ||  ||  ||  || 
|-
| 58 || June 13 || Carp ||  ||  ||  ||  ||  || 
|-
| 59 || June 14 || Carp ||  ||  ||  ||  ||  || 
|-
| 60 || June 16 || @Giants ||  ||  ||  ||  ||  || 
|-
| 61 || June 17 || @Giants ||  ||  ||  ||  ||  || 
|-
| 62 || June 20 || @Swallows ||  ||  ||  ||  ||  || 
|-
| 63 || June 21 || @Swallows ||  ||  ||  ||  ||  || 
|-
| 64 || June 26 || Hawks ||  ||  ||  ||  ||  || 
|-
| 65 || June 27 || Hawks ||  ||  ||  ||  ||  || 
|-
| 66 || June 28 || Hawks ||  ||  ||  ||  ||  || 
|-
| 67 || June 30 || Marines ||  ||  ||  ||  ||  || 
|-

|-
| 68 || July 1 || Marines ||  ||  ||  ||  ||  || 
|-
| 69 || July 2 || Marines ||  ||  ||  ||  ||  || 
|-
| 70 || July 3 || @Eagles ||  ||  ||  ||  ||  || 
|-
| 71 || July 4 || @Eagles ||  ||  ||  ||  ||  || 
|-
| 72 || July 5 || @Eagles ||  ||  ||  ||  ||  || 
|-
| 73 || July 7 || Fighters ||  ||  ||  ||  ||  || 
|-
| 74 || July 8 || Fighters ||  ||  ||  ||  ||  || 
|-
| 75 || July 9 || Fighters ||  ||  ||  ||  ||  || 
|-
| 76 || July 10 || Buffaloes ||  ||  ||  ||  ||  || 
|-
| 77 || July 11 || Buffaloes ||  ||  ||  ||  ||  || 
|-
| 78 || July 12 || Buffaloes ||  ||  ||  ||  ||  || 
|-
| 79 || July 14 || Eagles ||  ||  ||  ||  ||  || 
|-
| 80 || July 15 || Eagles ||  ||  ||  ||  ||  || 
|-
| 81 || July 16 || Eagles ||  ||  ||  ||  ||  || 
|-
| 82 || July 18 || @Fighters ||  ||  ||  ||  ||  || 
|-
| 83 || July 19 || @Fighters ||  ||  ||  ||  ||  || 
|-
| 84 || July 20 || Buffaloes ||  ||  ||  ||  ||  || 
|-
| 85 || July 21 || Buffaloes ||  ||  ||  ||  ||  || 
|-
| 86 || July 22 || Buffaloes ||  ||  ||  ||  ||  || 
|-
| 87 || July 28 || @Eagles ||  ||  ||  ||  ||  || 
|-
| 88 || July 29 || @Eagles ||  ||  ||  ||  ||  || 
|-
| 89 || July 31 || @Buffaloes ||  ||  ||  ||  ||  || 
|-

|-
| 90 || August 1 || @Buffaloes ||  ||  ||  ||  ||  || 
|-
| 91 || August 2 || @Buffaloes ||  ||  ||  ||  ||  || 
|-
| 92 || August 4 || Fighters ||  ||  ||  ||  ||  || 
|-
| 93 || August 5 || Fighters ||  ||  ||  ||  ||  || 
|-
| 94 || August 6 || Fighters ||  ||  ||  ||  ||  || 
|-
| 95 || August 7 || Hawks ||  ||  ||  ||  ||  || 
|-
| 96 || August 8 || Hawks ||  ||  ||  ||  ||  || 
|-
| 97 || August 9 || Hawks ||  ||  ||  ||  ||  || 
|-
| 98 || August 11 || @Marines ||  ||  ||  ||  ||  || 
|-
| 99 || August 12 || @Marines ||  ||  ||  ||  ||  || 
|-
| 100 || August 13 || @Marines ||  ||  ||  ||  ||  || 
|-
| 101 || August 14 || @Fighters ||  ||  ||  ||  ||  || 
|-
| 102 || August 15 || @Fighters ||  ||  ||  ||  ||  || 
|-
| 103 || August 16 || @Fighters ||  ||  ||  ||  ||  || 
|-
| 104 || August 18 || @Hawks ||  ||  ||  ||  ||  || 
|-
| 105 || August 19 || @Hawks ||  ||  ||  ||  ||  || 
|-
| 106 || August 20 || @Hawks ||  ||  ||  ||  ||  || 
|-
| 107 || August 21 || Marines ||  ||  ||  ||  ||  || 
|-
| 108 || August 22 || Marines ||  ||  ||  ||  ||  || 
|-
| 109 || August 23 || Marines ||  ||  ||  ||  ||  || 
|-
| 110 || August 25 || Eagles ||  ||  ||  ||  ||  || 
|-
| 111 || August 26 || Eagles ||  ||  ||  ||  ||  || 
|-
| 112 || August 27 || Eagles ||  ||  ||  ||  ||  || 
|-
| 113 || August 28 || @Buffaloes ||  ||  ||  ||  ||  || 
|-
| 114 || August 29 || @Buffaloes ||  ||  ||  ||  ||  || 
|-
| 115 || August 30 || @Buffaloes ||  ||  ||  ||  ||  || 
|-

|-
| 116 || September 1 || @Eagles ||  ||  ||  ||  ||  || 
|-
| 117 || September 2 || @Eagles ||  ||  ||  ||  ||  || 
|-
| 118 || September 3 || @Eagles ||  ||  ||  ||  ||  || 
|-
| 119 || September 4 || @Hawks ||  ||  ||  ||  ||  || 
|-
| 120 || September 5 || @Hawks ||  ||  ||  ||  ||  || 
|-
| 121 || September 6 || @Hawks ||  ||  ||  ||  ||  || 
|-
| 122 || September 8 || Fighters ||  ||  ||  ||  ||  || 
|-
| 123 || September 9 || Fighters ||  ||  ||  ||  ||  || 
|-
| 124 || September 10 || Fighters ||  ||  ||  ||  ||  || 
|-
| 125 || September 11 || Buffaloes ||  ||  ||  ||  ||  || 
|-
| 126 || September 12 || Buffaloes ||  ||  ||  ||  ||  || 
|-
| 127 || September 13 || Buffaloes ||  ||  ||  ||  ||  || 
|-
| 128 || September 15 || @Marines ||  ||  ||  ||  ||  || 
|-
| 129 || September 16 || @Marines ||  ||  ||  ||  ||  || 
|-
| 130 || September 17 || @Marines ||  ||  ||  ||  ||  || 
|-
| 131 || September 18 || Hawks ||  ||  ||  ||  ||  || 
|-
| 132 || September 19 || Hawks ||  ||  ||  ||  ||  || 
|-
| 133 || September 20 || Hawks ||  ||  ||  ||  ||  || 
|-
| 134 || September 21 || @Fighters ||  ||  ||  ||  ||  || 
|-
| 135 || September 22 || @Fighters ||  ||  ||  ||  ||  || 
|-
| 136 || September 23 || @Fighters ||  ||  ||  ||  ||  || 
|-
| 137 || September 25 || Eagles ||  ||  ||  ||  ||  || 
|-
| 138 || September 26 || Eagles ||  ||  ||  ||  ||  || 
|-
| 139 || September 27 || Eagles ||  ||  ||  ||  ||  || 
|-
| 140 || September 29 || Marines ||  ||  ||  ||  ||  || 
|-
| 141 || September 30 || Marines ||  ||  ||  ||  ||  || 
|-

|-
| 142 || October 1 || Marines ||  ||  ||  ||  ||  || 
|-
| 143 || October 3 || @Eagles ||  ||  ||  ||  ||  || 
|-
| 144 || October 5 || @Fighters ||  ||  ||  ||  ||  || 
|-

Player stats

Batting

Pitching

References

Saitama Seibu Lions
Saitama Seibu Lions seasons